The 1924 Winter Olympics ice hockey rosters consisted of 82 players on 8 national ice hockey teams. Played at the first edition of the Winter Olympics, it was also considered to be the World Championship by the International Ice Hockey Federation (IIHF), the second overall (after the 1920 Summer Olympics, which had ice hockey). Teams were required to be strictly amateur, so players from the Canadian-based National Hockey League (NHL) or other professional leagues were excluded. Canada sent the Toronto Granites, who had won the 1923 Allan Cup, the amateur championship in Canada.

Belgium
Head coach: André Poplimont

Canada
Head coach: Frank Rankin

Czechoslovakia
Head coach:

France
Head coach: Robert Lacroix

Great Britain
Head coach: Guy Clarkson

Sweden

Switzerland
Head coach: Peter Müller

United States
Head coach: William Haddock

References

Sources

 1924 Olympic Games report. pp. 706–708 (in French) (digitized copy online)

players
1924